The stippled darter (Etheostoma punctulatum) is a species of freshwater ray-finned fish, a darter from the subfamily Etheostomatinae, part of the family Percidae, which also contains the perches, ruffes and pikeperches. It is  found in Missouri and White River drainages in Ozark Uplands of Missouri and Arkansas. Isolated population occurs in upper Castor River of southeastern Missouri. It inhabits rocky pools of headwaters and creeks.

References 

Etheostoma
Fish described in 1854
Taxa named by Louis Agassiz